Paolo Lorenzi and Giancarlo Petrazzuolo were the defending champions, but they decided not to participate this year.
Alessio di Mauro and Alessandro Motti won the doubles title, defeating Nikola Mektić and Ivan Zovko in the finals, 6–2, 3–6, [10–3].

Seeds

Draw

Draw

References

Trofeo Bellaveglia - Doubles
Orbetello Challenger